Earth Journalism Network (EJN) is an Internews and Internews Europe project. Internews is an international non-profit organization.

Work

Fellowships
Both independently and in partnership with other organizations, the Earth Journalism Network awards fellowships to journalists which allow them to attend conferences within the field of environmentalism. During these events, which have included several Conferences of the Parties (COPs) and Rio+20, journalists participate in activities and report on event developments for their local media outlets. Prior to and throughout these events, EJN holds workshops to train reporters on environmental journalism best practices.

Partners
At the start of 2013, the Earth Journalism Network established a partnership with the graduate School of Communication of the University of California in Berkeley.

Advocacy

Murder of Hang Serei Oudom 
In September 2012, the Earth Journalism Network and the Society of Environmental Journalists circulated a joint petition calling on the Cambodian government to launch a full investigation into the murder of environmental journalist Hang Serei Oudom. Oudom had been covering illegal logging activities for the local newspaper Vorakchun Khmer Daily  when his body was discovered with several axe blows to the head. The New York Times''' Andrew Revkin  called attention to this petition on his blog Dot Earth.

Leadership
James Fahn is the executive director of Earth Journalism Network. Fahn was originally based in Thailand for nine years where he was a reporter and editor for The Nation'', an English-language daily newspaper based in Bangkok.

References

Further reading

External links
 Official website
 Internews
 Internews Europe
 InfoAmazonia
 Climate Commons

International non-profit organizations
Journalism organizations
Organizations established in 2004